Velimir Brašnić (born 6 May 1977) is a Bosnian retired football player.

Club career
He has primarily played for Brotnjo Čitluk and Orašje.

International career
Brašnić made his debut for Bosnia and Herzegovina in a June 2001 Merdeka Tournament match against Slovakia and has earned a total of 5 caps (2 unofficial), scoring 1 goal. His final international was a July 2011 friendly match against Iran.

References

External links

Profile - NFSBIH

1977 births
Living people
Association football defenders
Bosnia and Herzegovina footballers
Bosnia and Herzegovina international footballers
NK Brotnjo players
HNK Orašje players
NK Zadar players
Premier League of Bosnia and Herzegovina players
Croatian Football League players
Bosnia and Herzegovina expatriate footballers
Expatriate footballers in Croatia
Bosnia and Herzegovina expatriate sportspeople in Croatia